Horehound beer or horehound ale is a soft drink (alcohol-free) carbonated beverage, flavoured primarily with herbs (principally horehound), double hops and cane sugar. It is drunk in the southern United States, Australia and England.

See also
Beer
Birch beer
bitter melon or Goya 
Malt beverage
Root beer
Sassafras
Soft drink

References
Horehound at Botanical.com
Facciola. S. Cornucopia - A Source Book of Edible Plants. Kampong Publications 1990 
Bown. D. Encyclopaedia of Herbs and their Uses. Dorling Kindersley, London. 1995 
Grieve. A Modern Herbal. Penguin 1984 

Soft drinks
Soft beers and malt drinks